Milou en mai, released as Milou in May in the UK and as May Fools in North America, is a 1990 film by Louis Malle. The film portrays the impact of the French revolutionary fervour of May 1968 on a French village.

Milou en mai was filmed at Château du Calaoué, in the Gers département, southwestern France.

Synopsis
Milou's mother dies just as the unrest and strikes are sweeping the country.  The events interfere with the plans for a funeral and disrupt the family and a stranded truck driver.  The film combines elements of social and interpersonal commentary with farce.

Cast
 Miou-Miou as Camille, Milou's daughter
 Michel Piccoli as Milou
 Michel Duchaussoy as Georges, Milou's brother
 Bruno Carette as Grimaldi
 François Berléand as Daniel
 Dominique Blanc as Claire
 Valérie Lemercier as Madame Boutelleau
 Paulette Dubost as Mrs. Vieuzac, Milou's mother
 Harriet Walter as Lily, Milou's sister-in-law
 Martine Gautier as Adèle, the servant and Milou's lover
 Rozenne Le Tallec as Marie-Laure
 Jeanne Herry as Françoise (as Jeanne Herry-Leclerc)
 Renaud Danner as Pierre-Alain

Awards 
 Best Foreign Direction, David di Donatello Awards 1990.
 Nomination for Best Foreign Film, BAFTA Awards 1991.
 César Award for Best supporting Actress: Dominique Blanc. Nominations for Césars for Best Actor: Michel Piccoli, Best Actress: Miou-Miou, and Best Supporting Actor: Michel Duchaussoy. 1991.

References

External links 
 
 
 
 

1990 films
Films directed by Louis Malle
Films set in 1968
French satirical films
French political satire films
French historical comedy films
1990s historical comedy films
Films with screenplays by Jean-Claude Carrière
1990 comedy films
1990s French films